John O'Keefe (born 24 November 1943) is a former Australian rules footballer who played with Fitzroy in the Victorian Football League (VFL).

Notes

External links 		
		

Living people
1943 births
Australian rules footballers from Victoria (Australia)
Fitzroy Football Club players